Anchises was a member of the royal family of Troy in Greek and Roman legend. He was said to have been the son of King Capys of Dardania and Themiste, daughter of Ilus, who was son of Tros. He is most famous as the father of Aeneas and for his treatment in Virgil's Aeneid. Anchises' brother was Acoetes, father of the priest Laocoön.

He was a mortal lover of the goddess Aphrodite (equivalent to the Roman goddess Venus). Zeus made her fall in love with Anchises while he was herding sheep at the foot of Mount Ida. One version is that Aphrodite pretended to be a Phrygian princess and seduced him, only to later reveal herself and inform him that they would have a son named Aeneas; Aphrodite had warned Anchises that if he told anyone about her being the mother of his child, Zeus would strike him down with his thunderbolt. He did not heed her warning and was struck with a thunderbolt, which in different versions either blinds him or kills him. The principal early narrative of Aphrodite's seduction of Anchises and the birth of Aeneas is the Homeric Hymn (5) to Aphrodite. According to the Bibliotheca, Anchises and Aphrodite had another son, Lyrus, who died childless. He later had a mortal wife named Eriopis, according to the scholiasts, and he is credited with other children beside Aeneas and Lyrus. Homer, in the Iliad, mentions a daughter named Hippodamia, their eldest ("the darling of her father and mother"), who married her cousin Alcathous.

After the defeat of Troy in the Trojan War, the elderly Anchises was carried from the burning city by his son Aeneas, accompanied by Aeneas' wife Creusa, who died in the escape attempt, and small son Ascanius. The subject is depicted in several paintings, including a famous version by Federico Barocci in the Galleria Borghese in Rome. The rescue is also mentioned in a speech in Shakespeare's Julius Caesar when Cassius attempts to persuade Brutus to murder Caesar. Anchises himself died and was buried in Sicily many years later. Aeneas later visited Hades and saw his father again in the Elysian Fields.

Homer's Iliad mentions another Anchises, a wealthy native of Sicyon in Greece and father of Echepolus.

The Homeric Hymn to Aphrodite 
The Homeric Hymn to Aphrodite details how Aphrodite seduced Anchises. It begins by describing how only the three virgin goddesses (Athena, Artemis, and Hestia) are immune to Aphrodite's powers. She has made gods and goddesses fall in love with mortals. Not even Zeus was able to escape her powers and to put her in her place, he caused her to lust after the handsome mortal Anchises.

Aphrodite first happens upon Anchises on the hills of Mount Ida, where he is grazing his cattle. Anchises is described as having the beauty of an immortal. Aphrodite goes to Cyprus and bathes. Then she returns to the Troad disguised as a mortal, and finds Anchises alone in a hut. When Anchises first sees Aphrodite, he is convinced that she is a goddess, a grace, or a nymph. She convinces him that she is a Phrygian princess and that Hermes brought her there to marry Anchises. Anchises is overcome with desire for her and declares that he must have her immediately, and the two of them make love.

After they have sex, Aphrodite puts Anchises into a deep sleep and dresses herself. When she is finished dressing, she wakes him up and reveals herself to him. When Anchises realizes her identity he is terrified and full of regret, and says that no good comes from sleeping with a goddess. Aphrodite comforts him by telling him that she will bear him a son by the name of Aeneas, who will be respected among the Trojans and whose offspring will prosper. To further comfort Anchises she goes on to tell him about two relationships: the relationship between Zeus and Ganymede and the relationship between Eos and Tithonus. Both relationships are between an immortal and a mortal who survives the relationship. She then details how their son will be raised by nymphs until he is five years old, at which time she will bring Aeneas to him. Then she leaves, warning him not to reveal that she is the mother of his child or Zeus will smite him.

Anchises in the Aeneid 
The Aeneid by Virgil describes the journey of Aeneas after the fall of Troy. Anchises, the father of Aeneas, is a character in the epic. Even though Anchises is dead for most of the epic, he still makes multiple appearances in it, oftentimes to advise Aeneas.

Book 2 

Anchises' first major appearance comes in Book 2. He is mentioned while Aeneas is telling Dido about the fall of Troy. During the fall of Troy, Aeneas makes his way home to save Anchises, his wife Creusa, and his son Ascanius. At first Anchises refuses to go with Aeneas and tells Aeneas to leave without him. Aeneas refuses to leave Anchises and declares that they will all die in Troy. Creusa argues with Aeneas over his decision and while they are arguing a painless flame appears on Ascanius' head. Anchises notices this and prays to Jupiter for a sign that they must leave. Just then they hear thunder and see a falling star. This convinces Anchises to go willingly with Aeneas. Aeneas carries Anchises on his back, Anchises carries their household gods, and Ascanius walks beside his father as they all flee Troy. Creusa was following behind them but is killed during the escape. As they leave Troy they meet up with other fleeing Trojans.

Book 3 
Anchises is mentioned in Book 3 while Aeneas continues his tale of how the Trojans came to be in Carthage. Anchises serves as a leader and advisor for the fleeing Trojans. After leaving Troy, the refugees make their way to Thrace and then to Delos. In Delos. Apollo tells them that they must make their new home in the original home of their ancestors. Anchises misinterprets this to mean Crete and so the Trojans head for Crete. There they establish a city but they are soon overwhelmed by a plague. Anchises instructs Aeneas to seek out the Delian oracle. Before he does, he is visited in his dreams by their household gods who inform him they are in the wrong place and they must go to Italy. Aeneas tells Anchises of this dream. Anchises realizes that Apollo must have meant for them to establish a home in Italy and so the Trojans head toward Italy. Italy is far away and the Trojans must make many stops. Anchises dies in Sicily before the Trojans make it to Italy.

Book 5 
Anchises is mentioned in Book 5 after the Trojans leave Carthage. Storms force them to stop in Sicily and Aeneas recalls that it has been a year since his father died. Aeneas declares that they will hold a festival in honor of the deceased Anchises. Rituals are performed and sacrifices are made at the tomb of Anchises. On the ninth day, Aeneas holds funeral games for his father that consist of a boat race, a foot race, boxing, archery, and a mock battle.  Anchises was buried with great honor. After the funeral games the Trojan women, tired of traveling,  set fire to the ships. Even though the most ships are saved by Jupiter, Aeneas loses heart and contemplates staying in Sicily. The ghost of Anchises then appears to Aeneas and offers him advice. He tells Aeneas that Jupiter sent him and that Jupiter saved the ships. He encourages Aeneas to continue his journey, informing him that he should leave the weary Trojans in Sicily and take the strongest Trojans with him to Italy. Anchises also instructs Aeneas to visit him in the underworld. Aeneas follows Anchises' advice and leaves Sicily but establishes that Anchises' tomb should have a priest and a tract of woodland before leaving.

Book 6 
Anchises is mentioned in Book 6 when Aeneas goes to the underworld. When Aeneas finds his father in the underworld they have a tearful reunion. Aeneas tries to hug Anchises but is unable to. Then Aeneas observes swarms of people gathered around a river. He ask his father about the river and the people surrounding it. Anchises tells him that the people are his future descendants and the river is Lethe. He expands that after suffering and being cleansed in the underworld, souls that are meant to be reincarnated go to the river Lethe to forget their memories so that they can be reincarnated. Anchises then shows Aeneas some of his descendants and discusses some of their deeds. He first mentions a son, Silvius, that will be born from Aeneas and Lavinia after Aeneas is dead. Anchises also mentions Romulus who is descended from Silvius, the Caesarian line that is descended from Ascanius, and that the Romans will prosper. Aeneas sees Marcellus and asks Anchises who he is. Anchises tells him how Marcellus will be a great grief for the Romans because he will hold great promise and die too young. Then Anchises leads Aeneas through the gates of horn and ivory and out of the underworld. This is the last major appearance of Anchises.

Anchises in Metamorphoses 
Anchises also makes a few brief appearances in Ovid's Metamorphoses. He is first mentioned in Book 9. After youth has been restored to Iolaus by Hebe, other gods and goddesses ask that youth be restored to their loved ones (9.418-450). Venus asks that youth be restored to Anchises (9.424-425).

Anchises is mentioned again in Book 13 during the story of the daughters of Anius. The story begins by briefly describing how Aeneas, Anchises, Ascanius, and other Trojan refugees flee Troy, go to Antandros, then to Thrace, and finally arrive in Delos (13.623-631). Once in Delos, Anchises asks Anius, who is the king and a priest of Apollo, about his children (13.639-642). Anius tells how his daughters received the ability to turn things they touched into grain, wine, and olive oil but how this gift caused them nothing but misery because the Greeks kidnapped them (13.651-659). So his daughters asked to be delivered and were turned into white doves (13.667-674).

Anchises is briefly mentioned a couple of times in Book 14. The first time reads "And fleeing that new city in the sands, Aeneas once again returned to Eryx, the royal residence of his true friend Acestes; here, at Anchises' tomb he honored his father with gift offerings" (14.82-84). This alludes to the funeral games Aeneas holds for Anchises in Book 5 of the Aeneid. The second time reads "Aeneas did as he was told and saw the underworld's formidable resources, and his ancestral spirits, and the shade of that great-spirited and venerable man, father Anchises" (14.116-118). This alludes to the journey Aeneas takes to the underworld in Book 6 of the Aeneid.

Family tree

See also
The Golden Bough (mythology)
Mount Ida

Notes

Sources
Homeric Hymns. Homeric Hymn to Aphrodite.
Homer. Iliad II, 819–21; V, 260–73; XX, 215–40.
Virgil. Aeneid.
Bibliotheca III, xii, 2, Epitome V, 21.
Ovid. Metamorphoses XIII, 623–42; XIV, 82–119.
 Rose, H.J. (1924). Anchises and Aphrodite. The Classical Quarterly, Vol. 18, No. 1. (Jan., 1924), pp. 11–16.

References 

 Apollodorus, The Library with an English Translation by Sir James George Frazer, F.B.A., F.R.S. in 2 Volumes, Cambridge, MA, Harvard University Press; London, William Heinemann Ltd. 1921. ISBN 0-674-99135-4. Online version at the Perseus Digital Library. Greek text available from the same website.
 Homer, The Iliad with an English Translation by A.T. Murray, Ph.D. in two volumes. Cambridge, MA., Harvard University Press; London, William Heinemann, Ltd. 1924. . Online version at the Perseus Digital Library.
 Homer, Homeri Opera in five volumes. Oxford, Oxford University Press. 1920. . Greek text available at the Perseus Digital Library.
 The Homeric Hymns and Homerica with an English Translation by Hugh G. Evelyn-White. Homeric Hymns. Cambridge, MA.,Harvard University Press; London, William Heinemann Ltd. 1914. Online version at the Perseus Digital Library. Greek text available from the same website.
 Publius Ovidius Naso, Metamorphoses translated by Brookes More (1859-1942). Boston, Cornhill Publishing Co. 1922. Online version at the Perseus Digital Library.
 Publius Ovidius Naso, Metamorphoses. Hugo Magnus. Gotha (Germany). Friedr. Andr. Perthes. 1892. Latin text available at the Perseus Digital Library.
 Publius Vergilius Maro, Aeneid. Theodore C. Williams. trans. Boston. Houghton Mifflin Co. 1910. Online version at the Perseus Digital Library.
 Publius Vergilius Maro, Bucolics, Aeneid, and Georgics. J. B. Greenough. Boston. Ginn & Co. 1900. Latin text available at the Perseus Digital Library.

External links

Trojans
Consorts of Aphrodite
Princes in Greek mythology
Kings in Greek mythology
Characters in the Aeneid
Deeds of Zeus
Blind royalty and nobility
Deeds of Aphrodite
Mythological blind people